The Red Phallus is a 2018 Bhutanese Dzongkha-language drama film written and directed by Tashi Gyeltshen.

Plot
Sangay (Tshering Euden) is a highschool student living with her widowed and controlling father Ap Atsara (Dorji Gyeltshen), who plays the character of Atsara — a sacred character in various festivals and also carves wooden phalli for various rituals.  Sangay is bullied in school, partially for her father's profession. Sangay is having an affair with a married man named Passa (Singye) whose occupation as a butcher means his status in the society is very low. Passa is initially kind to Sangay but he eventually starts to berate her when she hesitates to run away to Thimphu with him.

An ordinary 16-year-old girl Sangoi lives with her father, who entertains people in the bazaar.  He has his costume, mask and wooden penises with which he performs all the actions (phalluses).
 Sangoi is withdrawn and depressed, she is fed up with phalluses, school and life.  She does not study well and is 4 years behind her peers.
 Despite that, she is in a relationship with a butcher, who persuades her to run away to the city.  The people believe that being a butcher is low and condemn the girl.  The psychologist calls Sangoi's father to school and tells him to separate them.
 Atsara (Sangoi's father) quarrels with Passa (the butcher) and almost kills him.
 Sangoi wants to leave, but he can't mentally.
 The butcher then rapes Sangoi during their meeting.
 Then she endures humiliation from him for a long time and then kills him with a board.  Arriving home, when her father was not at home, she cuts off all the phalluses.  It can also be seen that the phalluses are dripping with blood.
 The next day, Atsar's father returns home.  After talking to the traveling woman that he quit his job, he goes home afterwards.

 The film ends with this, it is not known whether Sangoi survived or died and how Atsara reacted.

Release and reception
The film was shown in several international film festivals. Tashi Gyeltshen decided not to release the film in Bhutan after Bhutan's censor board cut 12 minutes of the film. The film was picked up by Asian Shadows for international distribution.

Critical reception
Variety critic Richard Kuipers said that "[t]hough a tad slow at times, "Phallus" leaves a lasting impression". He also praised Tshering Euden's performance as the lead character. Writing for The Hollywood Reporter, Clarence Tsui described the film as a "taut and gripping debut." Davide Abbatescianni of Cineuropa criticized the performance of the male leads, character development and the rhythm of the narration but praised the sound design and "visual rigour" of the film. Alexander Knoth of Asian Movie Pulse praises the film as a "courageous feature mastering a gritty atmosphere" and the crew, writing "[t]he whole crew did an amazing job capturing the feeling of the environment and turning it into a metaphor for the cruel interpersonal proceedings that take place." In his review of the film for Eastern Kicks, Andrew Heskins gave it three out of five stars, calling it "[a]chingly beautiful but equally as slow".

Accolades
The film won the FIPRESCI award at the 23rd Busan International Film Festival and was nominated for the 2019 Best International Feature Film in Edinburgh International Film Festival.

References

External links

The Red Phallus on Rotten Tomatoes
The Red Phallus on Chinese Shadows

2018 drama films
2018 films
Bhutanese drama films
Dzongkha-language films
Films set in Bhutan
Nepalese drama films